Vilmos Sipos, also known as Vilim Šipoš and Willy Sipos (24 January 1914 – 25 July 1978) was a Hungarian football player and manager.  He played for several important clubs in a number of countries, having represented at national level both Yugoslavia and Hungary.

Career
Born in Wilhelmsburg, Austria, ethnically Hungarian, he begin playing with SK Građanski Sremska Mitrovica a local club in the town where he was living since young, in Vojvodina, still part of the Austro-Hungarian Empire back then. There he was spotted by Yugoslav SK Jugoslavija that offered him to move to Belgrade in 1930. After one season he moved to their Yugoslav First League main rivals at that time, Zagreb's HŠK Građanski where he will play until 1934. By 1934 his skills convinced the Yugoslav Football Association to offer him to play for the Yugoslav national team, having debuted on 18 March 1934 in a match against Bulgaria, a 2–1 win.

Having represented two of the most notable clubs in Yugoslavia and having become national team player, foreign interest grow, and in summer 1934 he moved to Swiss BSC Young Boys where he will play two seasons until 1936. That year he moved to one of the most prominent French clubs from that period, FC Sète. In the Ligue 1 he will play a total of 15 matches having scored twice. In this period he became a regular in the Yugoslav national team. In 1938 Zagreb's HŠK Građanski, with the financial effort of their vice-president Gustav Maceljski, who paid 100.000 Francs to Sète, brought him back, but after one season they sold him to FC Rapid București. On 7 May 1939, he played his last match for the Yugoslav national team, against Romania, in a 0–1 defeat.

By the beginning of the Second World War and the occupation of Yugoslavia, Sipos was playing in Romania. During this period he won 4 consecutive Romanian Cups, in 1939, 1940, 1941 and 1942. Interest on him grew again, and he moved to Hungarian Ferencváros in 1942. The club had been Hungarian league champions in 1940 and 1941, but Sipos will have to wait until 1944 to win the national title which was an unofficial one because the championship was unfinished. Being an ethnic Hungarian, and with Yugoslavia occupied, not competing, and with an uncertain future by then, Sipos was invited to play for the Hungarian national team making his debut in 1945.

At the end of the war in 1945 and with Hungary becoming a communist country, Ferencváros finished in a disappointing 5th place in 1946. Sipos decided to move abroad, and in summer 1946 he accepted an offer from Italian Bologna FC, coached by the Hungarian József Viola. The club had dominated the Serie A by the late 1930s winning 4 titles between 1935 and 1941, but that season, 1946–47 Bologna finished 5th. Sipos left next summer, but stayed in Italy where he will play with several clubs such as Correggio, Grosseto and Arsenale Messina. Before retiring he played one season in French Algeria with FC Jeunesse Oran where he was simultaneously the main coach and player.

After Algeria he moved to France where he kept playing exhibition matches until 1952 with IRO Hungaria, a team formed by Hungarian immigrants. Because many data from this period is lost or unavailable, it is believed that his career data is still incomplete. After retiring from football he moved to Paris where he lived until his death in 1978.

National team
Being considered one of the first professional players in Yugoslav football, he played a total of 13 matches for the Yugoslav national team between 1934 and 1939, having scored once, the only goal in the defeat against Czechoslovakia by 1–3, played on 28 May 1938.

Beside the Kingdom of Yugoslavia, Sipos played two matches for the Hungarian national team. The first was in Budapest against Romania in 1945, a smashing 7–2 win, where Sipos played in the attack alongside Nándor Hidegkuti, Gyula Zsengellér, Ferenc Puskás and István Nyers, and the second was in Vienna in 1946 against Austria, in a 2–3 defeat, with Sipos playing as right winger.

Honours
Ferencváros
Magyar Kupa (2): 1942–43, 1943–44
Rapid București
Cupa României (4): 1938–39, 1939–40, 1940–41, 1941–42

References

External links
 
 Profile at Reprezentacija.rs 
 Short career story at Nogometni leksikon 
 Stats from Italy at RSSSF (Hungarian players in Italy)

1914 births
1978 deaths
Yugoslav footballers
Yugoslavia international footballers
Hungarian footballers
Hungary international footballers
Expatriate footballers in Yugoslavia
SK Jugoslavija players
HŠK Građanski Zagreb players
Yugoslav First League players
BSC Young Boys players
Expatriate footballers in France
Ligue 1 players
FC Sète 34 players
FC Rapid București players
Ferencvárosi TC footballers
Serie A players
Bologna F.C. 1909 players
F.C. Grosseto S.S.D. players
Hungarian expatriate footballers
Expatriate footballers in Italy
Expatriate footballers in Switzerland
Expatriate footballers in Algeria
Expatriate footballers in Romania
Liga I players
Dual internationalists (football)
Association football forwards
Hungarian expatriate sportspeople in Yugoslavia